James Krause may refer to:

 James Krause (fighter) (born 1986), American mixed martial artist
 James Krause (footballer) (born 1987), English footballer